Poma, incorporated as Pomagalski S.A., and sometimes referred to as the Poma Group, is a French company which manufactures cable-driven lift systems, including fixed and detachable chairlifts, gondola lifts, funiculars, aerial tramways, people movers, and surface lifts. Poma has installed about 7800 devices for 750 customers worldwide.

Poma's only major competitor is the Doppelmayr Garaventa Group which is based in Austria and Switzerland.  Italy's Leitner Ropeways was historically another competitor until 2000 when Poma became part of Leitner Group.  Poma and Leitner remain independent, but formed a strategic partnership which includes the combined purchase of raw materials and the formation of Leitner-Poma as a joint venture in North America.

The majority of Poma's lifts are used in ski areas in Europe, Asia, and North America (as Leitner-Poma), they have also installed installations in amusement parks, scenic locations, and industrial transportation applications.

In some areas Poma lift is used as a generic term for a platter lift, as this was the company's first and most popular product.

History 

In 1936, Jean Pomagalski (born 1905, Kraków) installed his first ski lift on the Eclose Trail in l'Alpe d'Huez in France. In 1947, he founded Pomagalski S.A. in Fontaine, France. The first Poma chairlifts were built in 1958 in France and the United States. 1967 brought the first detachable gondolas built by Poma. The prototype gondola by Poma was the La Daille gondola at Val D'isere and installed in 1966 but replaced in 2018.  The corporate headquarters and the production shops are still in Fontaine, but since 1988 most of their management, design engineering, sales and service offices are in Voreppe, France. Poma currently employs approximately 750 people worldwide.

Early Poma chairlifts were installed at Squaw Valley, California for the 1960 Winter Olympics. Poma also supplied lifts for the Olympic Winter Games at Sarajevo, Yugoslavia in 1984, at Albertville, France in 1992, at Lillehammer, Norway in 1994 and has worked on the lifts for the 2014 Games at Sochi, Russia.

Products

Circulating ropeways

Fixed grip chairlifts

Poma's fixed grip chairlifts have proven popular throughout the world. Poma's first two-seater fixed grip chairlift was constructed in 1958. Following this, the three-seater chairlift was introduced in 1973. This was followed by four-seater, and more recently six seater fixed grip chairlifts.

The Alpha chairlift terminal was introduced in 1982 and continues to be popular today. Prior to the Alpha terminal, Delta terminals were used. This type of terminal was such a great success that even presently a majority can still be seen operating worldwide. Both the Delta and Alpha chairlift terminals have the capability of being converted into detachable lifts later on, thus increasing the chairlift's capacity without constructing an entirely new installation.

Detachable chairlifts

Poma introduced detachable chairlifts in 1972 in Pralognan-la-Vanoise (Dou de l'Ecu) and Saint-Lary (Soum de Matte). In 1982, Poma built a detachable chairlifts with an operating speed of 5 m/s - which, at the time, was the fastest in the world. In 1991, Poma unveiled their Omega detachable terminal which was more compact than previous terminals.  The company built its first six-passenger detachable chairlift in 1993 and its first eight-passenger lift was constructed in Méribel, France in the year 2000.  Also in 2000, the company replaced the Omega line of detachable terminals with the new Phoenix model. In addition, Poma also have now introduced the Multix terminals in their detachable chairlifts, while new North American lifts continue to feature the Omega terminal.

Gondola lifts

Poma built its first detachable gondolas in Val d'Isere and Queenstown (New Zealand) in 1966, and then, its first automatic gondolas in Chalmazel, Les Menuires (France)  in 1967.  It built the world's first six-passenger gondola in 1973, also in France in Villard-de-Lans.  The world's first ten-passenger gondola was built by the company in 1984, followed by the world's first 16-passenger version in

Funitels

Hybrid lifts
Telemix is Poma's brand name for a detachable lift that is equipped with both gondola cabins and chairs. The terminal stations are the same as the company's detachable gondolas and chairlifts. These are common in the French resort of Alpe d'Huez.

Surface lifts
Poma's first model was the Pomalift, a surface lift with a disk that skiers straddle.  It has the ability to travel at high speeds because the platters are detachable from the haul rope, and because the perch is telescopic and has a pneumatic system which allows for a smooth and progressive departure. They are still sold today along with T-Bars and fixed grip platters.

Reversible aerial tramways
Poma has built a number of large aerial tramways. In 2003, Poma built the world's largest reversible ropeway to connect the French resorts of Les Arcs and La Plagne, the Vanoise Express.  The double decker tramway can hold up to 200 people at a time in each cabin. In 2010, Poma worked on the replacement of the Roosevelt Island Tramway in New York, using a design based mechanically on the Vanoise Express.

Funiculars and people movers
Poma has built numerous funiculars which are cable driven railways that can climb steep pitches.  Poma also had a partnership with Otis Elevator, known as Poma-Otis Transportation Systems, to build Automated People Movers.

Gallery

Subsidiaries
Leitner-Poma
Leitner-Poma of America, Inc. builds lifts in North America, Australia, and New Zealand. Leitner-Poma offers the full line of Poma products and manufactures most of the components at its headquarters in Grand Junction, Colorado.

Poma came to North America in the early 1950s under the name of Pomalift, Inc., installing its first lift in Canada in 1952 and in the US in 1953. Pomalift Inc. changed its name to Poma of America in 1981 with the establishment of its office and factory at Grand Junction, Colorado.  Since 1989, all detachable chairs for North America, New Zealand, and Australia have been designed and built in Colorado. In September 2001, the merger of Poma and Leitner's North American operations was announced forming Leitner-Poma of America.

Sigma Cabins
Founded in 1961 and incorporated as Sigma Composite SA, this company is based in Veyrins, Isère, France, and manufactures cabins for HTI Group's ropeways and people movers. The company also produces cabins for other applications such as ferris wheels. Its competitors are Doppelmayr subsidiary CWA; Bartholet subsidiary Gangloff; and Carvatech.

Skirail
Skirail designs and builds inclined lifts, chairlifts, funicular railways and Cyclocables. The company was founded in 1981, and was acquired by Poma in 1987.

Baco
Baco AG was founded in 1950, and was acquired by Poma in 1981. Baco ceased manufacturing ropeways, however the company is still active, operating for Poma and Leitner Ropeways in Switzerland.

Comag
Comag SAS is based in Bourg-Saint-Maurice, Savoie, France, and operates as  Poma's civil engineering and mountain installations company.

SACMI
Société Savoyarde de Construction et de Matériel Industriel, known as SACMI, was founded in 1960, and was later acquired by Poma. The company is located in Gilly-sur-Isère, France, and manufactures mechanically welded components and other pre-assembled parts for Poma's ropeways.

Semer
Semer SA is based in le Fayet, Haute-Savoie, France, it is responsible for the automation and electronics used in Poma Group's products.

There is also a network of overseas subsidiaries such as Leitner Poma Japan and Poma Beijing Ropeways.

In 1975 a License Agreement for production of ropeway systems designed for the passenger transport took place between Pomagalski s. a. and TPMP Kežmarok (then Czechoslovakia, now Slovakia). Based on the License Agreement production of skilifts named "Tatrapoma" has commenced. The agreement ended in 1991, but TPMP Kežmarok continued to manufacture ski lifts ever since (now as Tatralift).

See also 

 Ski lifts
 List of aerial lift manufacturers
 Maokong Gondola
Nizhny Novgorod cable car

References 

Aerial lift manufacturers
 Poma
Manufacturing companies of France
Manufacturing companies established in 1947
French companies established in 1947
French brands